

Events 
 March 17 – Violinist Giovanni Battista Viotti makes his début at the Concert Spirituel in Paris.
 August 4 – Wolfgang Amadeus Mozart marries Constanze Weber in Vienna.
 September 30 – The Royal Swedish Opera in Stockholm is inaugurated with a performance of Johann Gottlieb Naumann's Cora och Alonzo.
 William Shield is appointed resident composer to Covent Garden.
 Antoine Bournonville and his sister Julie Alix de la Fay join the Royal Swedish Ballet at Stockholm.

Published popular music 
James Aird (compiled and edited) – A Selection of Scotch, English, Irish and Foreign Airs (including "The Miners of Wicklow", possibly the first published version of "Yankee Doodle")
Robert Burns – John Barleycorn (original version from 16th century)

Classical music 
Ludwig van Beethoven 
9 Variations on a March by Dressler, WoO 63
Schilderung eines Mädchen, WoO 107
Friedrich Wilhelm Heinrich Benda – 3 Flute Concertos, Op. 4
Luigi Boccherini
Symphony in D major, Op. 35 no 1/G 509
Symphony in E-flat major, Op 35 no 2/G 510
Symphony in A major, Op. 35 no 3/G 511
Symphony in F major, Op. 35 no 4/G 512
Symphony in E-flat major, Op. 35 no 5/G 513
Giuseppe Maria Cambini – Seconde et nouvelle suite de simphonies concertantes à plusieurs instruments
Muzio Clementi 
3 Piano Sonatas, Op. 7
3 Piano Sonatas, Op. 8
François Joseph Gossec – Hymne à la Liberté, RH 628
Joseph Haydn 
Symphony No. 73 in D "La chasse"
Symphony No. 77 in B-flat major, Hob.I:77
Symphony No.78 in C minor, Hob.I:78
Divertimento in B-flat major, Hob.II:46 (authorship is disputed)
Keyboard Concerto in G major, Hob.XVIII:4
Keyboard Concerto in D major, Hob.XVIII:11
Mass in C major, Hob.XXII:8 "Mariazellermesse"
Michael Haydn – Divertimento in D major, MH 319
Wolfgang Amadeus Mozart
Symphony No. 35 in D "Haffner", K. 385
String Quartet in G, K. 387, No. 14
Fantasia in D minor, K.397/385g
Suite in C major, K.399/385i
Violin Sonata in C major, K.403/385c
Adagio in F major, K.410/484d
Emanuel Johann Gottfried Pässler – Sechs Sonaten für das Klavier oder die Harfe
Dieudonné-Pascal Pieltain – Violin Concerto No.3 in B-flat major
Johann Friedrich Reichardt – Klavierstück über eine Petrarchische Ode
Antonio Rosetti – 6 Symphonies, Op. 3
Johann Abraham Peter Schulz – Lieder im Volkston
Johannes Matthias Sperger – String Symphony in C
Giovanni Battista Viotti 
Concerto for Violin No. 2 in E major, G 44
Violin Concerto No.4 in D major
Violin Concerto No.5 in C major
Ernst Wilhelm Wolf – Osterkantate

Opera 
Giuseppe Maria Cambini – Alcide
Domenico Cimarosa 
L'amor costante
La ballerina amante
Circe
Il convito
L'eroe cinese
François-Joseph Gossec – Thésée
Joseph Haydn – Orlando paladino
Wolfgang Amadeus Mozart – Die Entführung aus dem Serail, 16 July, Burgtheater in Vienna.
Giovanni Paisiello – Il barbiere di Siviglia
Giuseppe Sarti – Fra i due litiganti il terzo gode

Methods and theory writings 

 Anton Bemetzrieder – Abstract of a New Method of Teaching the Principles of Music
 Heinrich Philipp Bossler – Elementarbuch der Tonkunst zum Unterricht beim Klavier
 Michel Corrette – L’art de se perfectionner dans le violon
 Johann Kirnberger – Gedanken über die verschiedenen Lehrarten in der Komposition
 Louis-Toussaint Milandre – Méthode facile pour la viole d'amour, Op.5
 Johann Friedrich Reichardt – Musikalisches Kunstmagazin

Births 
 January 29 – Daniel Auber, composer
April 14 – Carlo Coccia, composer
July 19 – Jonathan Blewitt, composer and son of Jonas Blewitt (died 1805)
July 26 – John Field, pianist and composer
September 23 – Jacques Féréol Mazas, composer and musician (died 1849)
October 27 – Niccolò Paganini, violinist
December 21 – Benoit Tranquille Berbiguier, flautist (died 1835)

Deaths 
January 1 – Johann Christian Bach, composer (b. 1735)
April 12 – Metastasio, poet and lyricist (b. 1698)
April 22 – Josef Ferdinand Norbert Seger, composer (b. 1716)
May – Joseph Kelway, composer and organist (born c. 1702)
May 6 – Herman Friedrich Voltmar, Danish composer (born 1707)
June 17 – Kane O'Hara, Irish composer (b. 1711)
July 15 – Robert Wainwright, composer
August – Jean-Baptiste Forqueray, viol player and composer (b. 1699)
August 6 – Nicolas Chédeville, composer (b. 1705)
September 16 – Farinelli, castrato singer (b. 1702)
October – John Parry, blind harpist (b. c. 1710)
October 23 – Joseph Riepel, German composer (born 1709)
December 28 – Maria Carolina of Savoy, composer and princess (born 1764)
date unknown 
Pedro António Avondano, Portuguese composer (b. 1714)
Jacob Raphael Saraval, writer and musician (b. c. 1707)

References

 
18th century in music
Music by year